The 1966 National Football League draft was held at the Summit Hotel in New York City on Saturday, November 27, 1965.

The expansion Atlanta Falcons were awarded the first pick in each round as well as the final pick in each of the first five rounds.  The first overall selection was Tommy Nobis, a linebacker from Texas. The league also provided the Falcons with an expansion draft six weeks later.

This was the last draft in which the NFL and the AFL selected their players separate of one another. As a result, most players drafted  by teams from both leagues chose to play for the more established NFL, but not all. Similar to 1965, the AFL draft was held on the same day. After the merger agreement in June 1966, a common draft was held in March 1967.

Player selections

Round one

 HOF Member of the Professional Football Hall of Fame

Round two

Round three

Round four

Round five

Round six

Round seven

Round eight

Round nine

Round ten

Round eleven

Round twelve

Round thirteen

Round fourteen

Round fifteen

Round sixteen

Round seventeen

Round eighteen

Round nineteen

Round twenty

Hall of Famers
 Tom Mack, guard from University of Michigan taken 1st round 2nd overall by the Los Angeles Rams.
Inducted: Professional Football Hall of Fame class of 1999.
 Emmitt Thomas, wide receiver/quarterback from Bishop College, signed as an undrafted free agent by the Kansas City Chiefs, who converted him to cornerback.
Inducted: Professional Football Hall of Fame class of 2008.

Notable undrafted players

See also
 1966 American Football League draft
 1966 NFL expansion draft

References

External links
 NFL.com – 1966 Draft
 databaseFootball.com – 1966 Draft
 Pro Football Hall of Fame

National Football League Draft
Draft
NFL Draft
American football in New York City
1960s in Manhattan
Sporting events in New York City
NFL Draft